The Veterans Memorial Coliseum (originally known as the Memorial Coliseum) is an indoor arena located in the oldest part of the Rose Quarter area in Portland, Oregon. The arena is the home of the Portland Winterhawks, a major junior ice hockey team, and was the original home of the Portland Trail Blazers of the National Basketball Association. It has been included on the National Register of Historic Places in recognition of its architectural significance.

Tenants
From 1960 to 1974 the Memorial Coliseum was the home of the Portland Buckaroos of the Western Hockey League, and it was the venue for the Final Four of the NCAA basketball tournament in March 1965, where UCLA won its second of ten such championships in the 1960s and 1970s.

Portland Trail Blazers

When the Portland Trail Blazers franchise was awarded for 1970, the Memorial Coliseum became the team's home court, capable of seating 12,666 when configured for basketball.  Three NBA Finals have been (partially) played in the Coliseum; in 1977 (when the Trail Blazers won) and in 1990 and 1992. The Blazers were 10–0 in the Coliseum during the 1977 playoffs, including the clincher in Game 6 of the Finals. The Detroit Pistons were the only visiting team to win the championship at the Coliseum, claiming their second consecutive championship in Game 5 of the 1990 Finals.

In 1974, Gerald Ford became the first president of the United States to attend an NBA game. On November 1 at Memorial Coliseum, he arrived in the third quarter and watched the Trail Blazers defeat the Buffalo Braves, 113–106.

Construction began on the nearby Rose Garden Arena (now Moda Center) soon after the 1992 NBA Finals, and it became the team's home arena when it opened in 1995.

As part of the team's 40th anniversary celebration, the Blazers played a pre-season game at Memorial Coliseum on October 14, 2009, against the Phoenix Suns. Team founder Harry Glickman, former players Jerome Kersey, Terry Porter, and Bob Gross, as well as broadcaster Bill Schonely attended the game. The Suns defeated the Blazers, 110–104, with 11,740 tickets sold.

In 2019, the Portland Trail Blazers celebrated their 50th season anniversary of becoming an NBA franchise. The organization played their first preseason game of the 2019–2020 season at the Memorial Coliseum on October 8, against the Denver Nuggets as a tribute to the stadium that the Trail Blazers called home for 25 years.

Portland Winterhawks
The building is currently the home arena of the Portland Winterhawks of the Western Hockey League, which used to split its schedule with the Moda Center prior to 2021. In August 2007, the City of Portland and the Portland Winterhawks reached an agreement to have replay screens installed in the main center ice scoreboard in time for the 2007–2008 hockey season. The city agreed to rent the screens, which are owned by the Winterhawks, for the first year, and then either buy them outright or replace them with different screens in 2008–09. Other improvements included adding a beer garden area, replacing graphic displays, and general painting and repairs.

Prior to the start of the 2021-22 WHL season, the Winterhawks announced they will be playing at Veterans Memorial Coliseum full-time.

Other occupants
The original Portland Timbers of the NASL played indoor soccer at the coliseum from 1979 to 1982. The Portland Power of the American Basketball League played in the Coliseum from 1996 to 1998. It hosted the OSAA 4A Men's State Basketball Tournament in March 1966 – 2003 and the March 2005 Big Sky Conference Basketball Tournament. The Memorial Coliseum hosts the Oregon High School Hockey League; local high school ice hockey teams play a few games each season and it also hosts some other events such as conventions, touring shows, and high school graduations. The Memorial Coliseum also hosts the OSAA High School Dance and Drill team State Championships every year in March.

Major events

The Memorial Coliseum was designed with large doors at both ends to accommodate the floats of the Portland Rose Festival's Grand Floral Parade.  The  parade begins at the Memorial Coliseum, where paying guests watch the parade cross the Coliseum's floor from reserved seats inside and from bleachers outside. The Rose Festival Queen's coronation has also been held in the facility since 1961.

On August 22, 1965, The Beatles played two shows at Memorial Coliseum to 20,000 screaming fans as part of their 1965 American Tour. Allen Ginsberg, who was in the audience, wrote a poem about the event called "Portland Coliseum". Led Zeppelin performed at the Coliseum on May 7, 1969 during their second North American Concert Tour, as well as March 23, 1970, and June 17, 1972, during their fifth and eighth North American Concert Tours.The Monkees Performed at the coliseum on August 26, 1967 on the final 3 shows of the summer 1967 tour

Elvis Presley performed at Memorial Coliseum on November 11, 1970, and again on April 27, 1973, in front of 12,000 and 13,000 fans, respectively. The Bee Gees performed two sold-out concerts on July 17 and 18, 1979, as part of their successful Spirits Having Flown Tour.

Bon Jovi played at the Memorial Coliseum for two consecutive nights as part of their New Jersey Syndicate Tour. During these shows on May 8, 1989 and May 9, 1989, the band recorded most of the footage for their music video Lay Your Hands On Me. 

A political rally for 2000 presidential candidate Ralph Nader sold 10,500 $7-tickets at the venue on August 26, 2000, with every seat sold except those behind the stage. President Barack Obama spoke at the Memorial Coliseum on March 21, 2008, before winning the Democratic Nomination.

Dew Tour
In 2004, Portland was selected as one of five cities in the U.S. to host the Dew Tour, an extreme sports franchise started in 2005. Titled the Vans Invitational, the event was held at the Rose Quarter August 17–21, 2005. The Memorial Coliseum hosted BMX: Park, BMX: Vert, Skateboard: Park, and Skateboard: Vert. The Dew Tour returned to the Rose Quarter again with the Wendy's Invitational on August 12–15, 2010, marking the tour's sixth year in Portland, which is the only city that has qualified to host the tour in every year since its inception.

Davis Cup Tennis final
From November 30 through December 2, 2007, the Memorial Coliseum hosted the 2007 Davis Cup Tennis final between the USA and Russia.

History

Financed by an $8 million bond approved by voters in 1954, construction was completed by Hoffman Construction in 1960 and dedicated on January 8, 1961, to the "advancement of cultural opportunities for the community and to the memory of our veterans of all wars who made the supreme sacrifice." It is sometimes referred to as "The Glass Palace" in Portland. The building was designed by architecture firm Skidmore, Owings & Merrill.

Original plans called for a building made of wood, which is plentiful in the region, but cost and safety factors precluded that. The structure instead consists of a modernistic gray glass and aluminum, non-load-bearing curtain-wall cube around a central ovular concrete seating bowl. Four  concrete piers support the steel roof, with no interior columns required. The curtain-wall windows inside offer views of the city in all directions. The  black curtains can be closed to block sunlight in 90 seconds. Seating includes 9,000 permanent seats expandable to 14,000 with portable chairs and bleachers. At its opening, it was called the largest multipurpose facility of its kind in the Pacific Northwest.

The war memorial consists of two black granite walls below ground level and near the main gate. The names of the dead are inscribed in gold paint, now faded with age. There are no dates given, only the names and an inscription: "To the memory of a supreme sacrifice we honor those who gave their lives for God, principle and love of country".

The International Style glass and concrete building was added to the National Register of Historic Places in September 2009.

In 2011, the Portland City Council voted to change the name of the arena from Memorial Coliseum to Veterans Memorial Coliseum, to better reflect its history as a memorial to war veterans, and as part of the larger Rose Quarter Development project.

The seating capacity for basketball has been as follows:

In 2018, Avantika Bawa had a solo exhibition of drawings and prints of the Veterans Memorial Coliseum at the Portland Art Museum, as part of the APEX series curated by Grace Kook-Anderson.

Future
It was proposed that Memorial Coliseum be demolished to make room for a 9,000-seat new ballpark for Merritt Paulson's Portland Beavers baseball team, since the team was moving from PGE Park to make room for the new Portland Timbers Major League Soccer franchise, also a Paulson-owned team. There had been talk about using two of the outer glass walls as part of the exterior for a new ballpark. Opposition to razing Memorial Coliseum included some veterans and architectural historians who successfully applied for National Register of Historic Places status for the building. Former governor Vic Atiyeh also opposed demolition if it led to the veteran memorial being forgotten. The Memorial Coliseum was given a rank of the highest importance in the city's historic resource inventory of 1984.  The proposal to demolish Memorial Coliseum was dropped early in May 2009 with Lents Park being re-considered as a ballpark site.

Other proposed uses of the grounds include turning the site into an entertainment district, a recreation center, a retail center, or a multilevel center for arts, athletics, and education. Another possibility is to update and repair the facility to improve its marketability. In December 2011, it was announced that the Coliseum will undergo a $30 million renovation, partially paid for by the city and partially by the Winterhawks. The renovations would be completed in the spring and summer of 2012.

See also

 Delta Dome, a proposed stadium in 1964
 List of sports venues in Portland, Oregon
 List of tennis stadiums by capacity
 Memorial Fountain
 The Oregon Veterans of World War II Memorial at the Oregon Capitol grounds in Salem.
 Oregon Department of Veterans' Affairs

References
 Specific

 General
Bosker, Gideon and Lena Lencek. Frozen Music: A History of Portland Architecture. Western Imprints, 1985.
Griffin, Anna. "Memorial Coliseum 's champion" Oregonian, April 15, 2009.
Jung, Helen. "Memorial Coliseum may be demolished for baseball park" Oregonian, April 7, 2009.
Jung, Helen. "Save Portland's Memorial Coliseum, but for what?" Oregonian, May 10, 2009.
King, Bart. An Architectural Guidebook to Portland. Oregon State University Press, 2007.
Larabee, Mark "City urged to move slowly on stadium, save coliseum" Oregonian, April 16, 2009 page B1.
Memorial Coliseum & Exhibit Hall, Portland, Oregon; Operated under Authority of the Exposition-Recreation Commission of the City of Portland. (Dedication program). 1960.
"1,200,000 Throng to 'Glass Palace' In Banner First Year", Oregonian, September 3, 1961 page 12. (an early reference to "glass palace" nickname)

External links and sources 

Rose Quarter - Venues
Memorial Coliseum Reuse Study, a City of Portland website
Memorial Coliseum in a Fight for its Life, from the website of Historic Preservation Northwest (February 16, 2003)
Portland's crown jewel or a clunker?, a March 2004 article from the Portland Tribune
Alternatives abound for coliseum's future, a July 2003 article from the Portland Tribune
Urban Home Center recommended for Memorial Coliseum redevelopment, a May 2003 article from the Portland edition of the Daily Journal of Commerce
Save Memorial Coliseum
National Register of Historic Places nomination
Photo Gallery of Blazers-Suns game at MC on October 14, 2009

 

Sports venues in Portland, Oregon
1960 establishments in Oregon
Indoor ice hockey venues in the United States
Defunct college basketball venues in the United States
Basketball venues in Oregon
Western Hockey League arenas
Indoor soccer venues in the United States
Former National Basketball Association venues
NCAA Division I men's basketball tournament Final Four venues
Portland Trail Blazers venues
Skidmore, Owings & Merrill buildings
High school sports in Oregon
National Register of Historic Places in Portland, Oregon
Portland Winterhawks
Portland Pilots men's basketball
North American Soccer League (1968–1984) indoor venues
Lloyd District, Portland, Oregon
North Portland, Oregon
Sports venues on the National Register of Historic Places in Oregon
Sports venues completed in 1960
Music venues in Portland, Oregon
Indoor arenas in Oregon